Eric Opoku is a Ghanaian politician and member of the Seventh Parliament  and 8th Parliament of the Fourth Republic of Ghana representing the Asunafo South Constituency in the Brong-Ahafo Region on the ticket of the National Democratic Congress.

Early life and education 
Eric Opoku was born on 5 June 1970. He hails from a town called Sankore in the Brong Ahafo region of Ghana. He had his Bachelor of Arts degree in Social Science from Kwame Nkrumah University of Science and Technology in year 2004.

Career 
Opoku is a farmer/ agriculturist. Prior to his appointment into parliament, he worked as a teacher with the Ghana Education Service at SDA Primary School in Sankore, from 1997 to 2000. He has also worked with Kuapa Kookoo Ltd as the Society Development Secretary from 1998 to 2001.

Political career 
Opoku was first elected into parliament in the 3rd parliament of the 4th republic of Ghana as the member of parliament for the Asunafo South constituency in the Brong Ahafo region of Ghana. Though he lost his seat in the subsequent election, he was elected again into parliament on 7 January 2013 after claiming victory at the 2012 Ghanaian General Elections to represent the Asunafo South constituency and served until 6 January 2017. He was then reelected on 7 January 2017 after the 2016 Ghanaian General Elections where he obtained 52.97% of the valid votes cast. He has worked as the Deputy Brong Ahafo Regional Minister from 2009 to 2013. In the 7th parliament of the 4th republic of Ghana he served on the Food, Agriculture and Cocoa Affairs Committee as a ranking Member. He also served on the Privileges Committee and Appointments Committee in the same parliament.

Opoku received an award as the best member of parliament for communal and rural development for 2017 from the Bureau of Research on Governance, Commerce and Administration (BORGCA). This award was given for his contribution to developmental projects in the Asunafo South constituency.

Elections 
Opoku was elected as the member of parliament for the Asunafo South constituency of the Brong Ahafo region in the 2004 Ghanaian general elections. He won on the ticket of the National Democratic Congress. His constituency was a part of the 10 parliamentary seats out of a total 24 seats won by the National Democratic Congress in that election for the Brong Ahafo Region.  The Asunafo South constituency saw a ‘skirt and blouse’ voting by electorates in that election as the presidential candidate elected by the constituency electorates was John Kufour of the major opposition New Patriotic Party. The National Democratic Congress won a minority total of 94 parliamentary seats out of 230seats in that elections. Opoku was elected with 14,076votes out of 29,345total valid votes cast, equivalent to 48% of total valid votes cast. He was elected over George William Amponsah of the New Patriotic Party, Jack Kennedy Brobbey an independent candidate and Fredrick Nkrumah of the Convention People's Party. These obtained 43.80% , 7.30%  and 0.90% respectively of total valid votes cast.

Opoku was re-elected in the 2020 Parliamentary election to represent them in the 8th Parliament of the fourth Republic of Ghana .

Attack 
Opoku was attacked in his residence on 25 December 2017 in his residence in Sankore in the Brong Ahafo region of Ghana. The National Democratic Congress alleged that the attackers were armed supporters of the opposition New Patriotic Party. He was attacked for the second time, on 1 April 2018, also in his home in Sankore  by armed men. Though left unharmed the attackers allegedly made away with about GHS 10,400.00, a television set and decoder and damaged three of Opoku's vehicles.

Personal life 
Opoku is a Christian.  He is married with four children.

References

Ghanaian MPs 2005–2009
Ghanaian MPs 2013–2017
Ghanaian MPs 2017–2021
1970 births
Living people
National Democratic Congress (Ghana) politicians
Government ministers of Ghana
Ghanaian MPs 2021–2025
People from Bono Region
Kwame Nkrumah University of Science and Technology alumni